Allison Beth Krause (April 23, 1951 – May 4, 1970) was an American honor student at Kent State University in Kent, Ohio, when she was killed by soldiers of the Ohio Army National Guard in the Kent State shootings, while protesting against the invasion of Cambodia and the presence of the National Guard on the Kent State campus. National Guardsmen opened fire on a group of unarmed students, killing four of them, at an average distance of about 345 ft (106 m). A subsequent autopsy found that a single rifle bullet entered and exited her upper left arm, and then entered the left side of her chest, fragmenting on impact and causing massive internal trauma. She died from her wounds later the same day.

Background
Krause was born in Cleveland, Ohio, the daughter of Doris Lillian (Levine) and Arthur Selwyn Krause. She had a younger sister, Laurel. Krause was Jewish. She was an alumna of John F. Kennedy High School in Silver Spring, Maryland. Her parents moved to Churchill, Pennsylvania, the summer before she began attending Kent State.

Altogether, the Guardsmen fired 67 shots in 13 seconds. The other students killed in the shootings were Jeffrey Glenn Miller, Sandra Lee Scheuer and William Knox Schroeder. In addition, nine other students were wounded in the gunfire.

The shootings led to protests and a national student strike, causing hundreds of campuses to close because of both violent and non-violent demonstrations. The Kent State campus remained closed for six weeks. Five days after the shootings, 100,000 people demonstrated in Washington, D.C. against the war. Krause's father became an outspoken advocate of the press for truth and justice about what occurred that day and fought it in the courts for nearly 10 years following the death of his daughter. In the end, the family of Allison Krause received a 'Statement of Regret' and $15,000 from the state of Ohio for the loss of Allison.

In 2010, Krause's sister Laurel co-founded the Kent State Truth Tribunal (KSTT) with Emily Kunstler. The tribunal was organized to uncover, record and preserve the testimonies of witnesses, participants and meaningfully involved individuals of the Kent State shootings of 1970. Showing his support, Michael Moore livecast every KSTT testimonial at his website. In all, three tribunals were held in 2010: May 1, 2, 3 and 4 in Kent, Ohio at the 40th anniversary of the shootings; with a west coast tribunal in San Francisco in August and an east coast tribunal in New York City in October 2010.

Films
Allison (dir. Richard Myers, 1971)

References
Notes

Works cited

Krause, Arthur S. (1972). "May 4, 1970." The New York Times, May 4, 1972.
Krause, Arthur S. (1978). "A Memo to Mr. Nixon." The New York Times, May 7, 1978.

External links

Poem about Allison Krause
Poem dedicated to Allison Krause: 
Column: Are Flowers Better Than Bullets?
Kent State Truth Tribunal
Kent State: Truth Emerging in this Cold Case Homicide , a poem written by Laurel Krause and entered in the U.S. Congressional Record on December 14, 2010, at the request of Congressman Dennis Kuncinich

Allison Krause: May 4 Archive

1951 births
1970 deaths
American anti–Vietnam War activists
20th-century American Jews
Deaths by firearm in Ohio
Kent State University alumni
Kent State shootings
People from Cleveland